Fua Haripitak (22 April 1910 – October 1993) was a celebrated Thai artist.

Biography

Early life
Fua was born on 22 April 1910 in Thonburi, the son of a court painter who had served under Phya Anusat Chitrakorn.

He studied art for four years at Bangkok's Poh Chang School of Arts and Crafts before quitting after he found the teaching method too academic.

Key works and development
He later graduated from the School of Fine Arts (later known as Silpakorn University), a student of Silpa Bhirasri.  Among his finest surviving works from that period is an oil portrait titled "My Grand Mother".

During 1940-1946, he received a scholarship from Thanomsakdi Kridakorn to study at Visva Bharati University in West Bengal, India.  After returning to Thailand, he served at Silpakorn University.  
He won gold metals at the 1st and 2nd National Exhibitions of Art in 1949 and 1950 for "Petchaburi", a tempera on paper and "Portrait of Madame Rienpracha", an oil on canvas.

During 1954-1956, he was granted a scholarship by the Italian government to study at the 
L'accademia Di Belle Arti (The Academy of Fine Art) in Rome.

During this period, he experimented with a variety of painting techniques, including chalk, colored pencils, ink, and the palette knife.  He also dabbled with abstract and cubist styles. His subjects were mostly Italian landscapes, but also included some nudes.  He was later recognized as a pioneer in Thailand's modern art.

In 1957, he again won the gold medal at the National Exhibition of Art.

A noted art restorer, from 1969-1982, Fua worked on the restoration of the Tripitaka Library at Wat Rakang Kositaram temple (also known as Wat Bang Wah Yai), built during the reign of King Rama I.  During that period, he paid for part of the restoration with his own funds.  The restoration project cost him his health.  The right side of his face and right arm were paralyzed.

In 1991, he was admitted to Siriraj Hospital.  He died in October 1993 due to inflamed blood vessels of the brain.

Awards
 1980 – Honorary doctoral degree in fine arts, Silpakorn University.
 1983 – Magsaysay Award for public service.  The award citation noted his "life-long profession of seeking the origins of his national artistic tradition, preserving the tradition, and through painting, restoration, writing and teaching, enlivening it with a future".
 1985 – Named National Artist, the inaugural year for the honor.
 1990 – Recognized by the Thai government as an Outstanding Cultural Conservator.

References
Part 1 and Part 2  of a short biography, in which The Nation newspaper cited him as one of the 35 most influential Thais
Short profile
 A selection of some of Fua Haripital's paintings

Notes

1910 births
1993 deaths
Fua Haripitak
Fua Haripitak
20th-century painters
Ramon Magsaysay Award winners